Nounan is an unincorporated community in Bear Lake County, Idaho.  It is located in the southeast corner of the state, a few miles west of Georgetown.

History

At one time, Nounan had a post office and elementary school and LDS Church meetinghouse, but its population shrunk substantially over the last half of the twentieth century and none of these function today, although some public buildings have been converted into private residences.  The church is currently a home and the school has been converted into a hay barn.

The economy of Nounan has traditionally been based on agriculture.

References

Unincorporated communities in Idaho
Unincorporated communities in Bear Lake County, Idaho